The provisional application of a treaty is a specific situation where a treaty or a part of a treaty is applied provisionally pending its entry into force. 

Article 25 of the Vienna Convention on the Law of Treaties provides:

See also
Provisional law (Norwegian law)

References

Further reading
 International Law Commission: Analytical Guide to the Work of the International Law Commission – Provisional application of treaties
 Brölmann, Guido Den Dekker (2020) Treaties, Provisional Application in Max Planck Encyclopedia of Public International Law of the Max Planck Encyclopedias of International Law
  Mahnoush H. Arsanjani, W. Michael Reisman (2011) Provisional Application of Treaties in International Law: The Energy Charter Treaty Awards in Enzo Cannizzaro, editor, The Law of Treaties Beyond the Vienna Convention. .
 Merijn Chamon (2020) Provisional Application of Treaties: The EU’s Contribution to the Development of International Law. European Journal of International Law, chaa061

External links 
 Provisional application of treaties -- Bibliographies on the topics of the International Law Commission (nos. 17/17A in the list) (UNOG Library)

Treaty law